Claddy is a townland in the civil parish of Aughagower and barony of Murrisk. It is bordered to the northwest by Carrowkennedy, to the north by Bracklagh and Rooghaun, to the northeast by Keelkill and Lackderrig, to the southeast by Derrinke, to the south by Erriff, and to the southwest by Derryilra and Derryherbert. In 1921, during the Carrowkennedy ambush, troops stayed in the houses of claddy and prepared in them.

References 
 

Townlands of County Mayo